Basap is an Austronesian language spoken in Borneo, Indonesia.

Within Kalimantan Timur and Kalimantan Utara provinces, Basap speakers are scattered across Berau, Bulungan, Kutai Kartanegara, Penajam Paser Utara, and Kutai Timur regencies. Dialects are Jembayan, Bulungan, Berau, Dumaring, Binatang, and Karangan (Ethnologue).

Smith (2018) considers Basap to have formed part of an ancient linkage of early forms of Barito languages in eastern Kalimantan.

References

Basap–Barito languages
Languages of Indonesia